This is a list of CDs released for the anime series Kimagure Orange Road.

Sound Color

Serial No – LD32-5049

Night Of Summer Side (SONG: Ikeda Masanori 池田政典 LYC: Masao Urino 売野雅勇 MSC: Nobody ARG: Shinkawa Hiroshi 新川博) [OP1] 4:09
 Red straw hat 赤い麦わら帽子 "Akai mugiwara boushi" (MSC: Sagisu Shirou 鷺巣詩郎 ARG: Sagisu Shirou 鷺巣詩郎) 2:45
ESP and the T.P.O. (Time-Place-Occasion) "E.S.P ni mo T.P.O" (MSC: Sagisu Shirou 鷺巣詩郎 ARG: Sagisu Shirou 鷺巣詩郎) 1:04
Blue sky blastoff! 青空をぶっとばせ！ "Aozora o buttobase!" (MSC: Sagisu Shirou 鷺巣詩郎 ARG: Sagisu Shirou 鷺巣詩郎) 1:33
Madoka's Theme ~ Lonely Concert まどかのテーマ ～ひとりぼっちのConcert "Madoka no TE-MA ~ hitoribocchi no Concert" (MSC: Sagisu Shirou 鷺巣詩郎 ARG: Sagisu Shirou 鷺巣詩郎) 2:27
Walk Struttin' (MSC: Sagisu Shirou 鷺巣詩郎 ARG: Sagisu Shirou 鷺巣詩郎) 2:10
Dangerous Triangle 危険なトライアングル "Kiken-na TORAIANGURU" (SONG: Ikeda Masanori 池田政典 LYC: Urino Masao 売野雅勇 MSC: Izumi Tsunehiro 和泉常寛 ARG: Shinkawa Hiroshi 新川博) [IS: Ep 11] 4:15
Summer Mirage 夏のミラージュ "natsu no MIRA-JU" (SONG: Wada Kanako 和田加奈子 LYC: Yukawa Reiko 湯川 れい子 MSC: Tsukasa ARG: Sagisu Shirou 鷺巣詩郎) [ED1] 4:30
Questions in secret 疑問符はナイショで "Gimonfu wa NAISHO de" (MSC: Sagisu Shirou 鷺巣詩郎 ARG: Sagisu Shirou 鷺巣詩郎) 1:52
Aerobics on 'RAP' (MSC: Sagisu Shirou 鷺巣詩郎 ARG: Sagisu Shirou 鷺巣詩郎) 1:52
Rock 'n' Roll Diabolic (MSC: Sagisu Shirou 鷺巣詩郎 ARG: Sagisu Shirou 鷺巣詩郎) 1:54
Exclamation's trickery Exclamationの悪だくみ "Exclamation no warudakumi" (MSC: Sagisu Shirou 鷺巣詩郎 ARG: Sagisu Shirou 鷺巣詩郎) 0:29
Honky-tonk Hip Hop to Us ホンキートンクHip Hop to Us（ヒポポタマス）"HONKI-TONKU Hip Hop to Us" [HIPOPOTAMUSU] (MSC: Sagisu Shirou 鷺巣詩郎 ARG: Sagisu Shirou 鷺巣詩郎) 1:40
Bayshore Dancing Way 湾岸Dancing Way "Wangan Dancing Way" (MSC: Sagisu Shirou 鷺巣詩郎 ARG: Sagisu Shirou 鷺巣詩郎) 2:38
Janina ジェニーナ "JENI-NA" (SONG: Wada Kanako 和田加奈子 LYC: Yukawa Reiko 湯川 れい子 MSC: Sagisu Shirou 鷺巣詩郎 ARG: Sagisu Shirou 鷺巣詩郎) [IS: Ep 12] 4:38

(Bonus Karaoke Tracks – CD Re-released on ?? 1999 Futureland TYCY-5427 Total Time = ??)
Summer Mirage (Karaoke Version) 夏のミラージュ(カラオケ) "natsu no MIRA-JU" (SONG: Wada Kanako 和田加奈子 LYC: Yukawa Reiko 湯川 れい子 MSC: Tsukasa ARG: Sagisu Shirou 鷺巣詩郎) [ED1] 4:??
 ジェニーナ(カラオケ) "JENI-NA" (SONG: Wada Kanako 和田加奈子 LYC: Yukawa Reiko 湯川 れい子 MSC: Sagisu Shirou 鷺巣詩郎 ARG: Sagisu Shirou 鷺巣詩郎) [IS: Ep 12] 4:??

[OP] = Opening Theme Song
[ED] = Ending Theme Song
[IS] = Insert Song

Sound Color 2

Serial No – LD32-5056

Orange Mystery オレンジ・ミステリー "ORENJI MISUTERII" (SONG: Nagashima Hideyuki 長島秀幸 LYC: Masao Urino 売野雅勇 MSC: Nobody ARG: Sagisu Shirou 鷺巣詩郎) [OP2] 3:55
Night Fog's Tiptoeing 夜霧の忍び足 "Yogiri no shinobi-ashi" (MSC: Sagisu Shirou 鷺巣詩郎 ARG: Sagisu Shirou 鷺巣詩郎) 1:39
FUTARI-DE (MSC: Sagisu Shirou 鷺巣詩郎 ARG: Sagisu Shirou 鷺巣詩郎) 3:05
Like a salvia flower サルビアの花のように "SARUBIA no hana no you ni" (SONG: Wada Kanako 和田加奈子 LYC: Yukawa Reiko 湯川 れい子 MSC: Oda Yuuichirou 小田裕一郎 ARG: Irie Jun 入江純) [IS: Ep 22] 3:58
Moment Suspense 瞬間サスペンス "Shunkan SASUPENSU" (MSC: Sagisu Shirou 鷺巣詩郎 ARG: Sagisu Shirou 鷺巣詩郎) 1:02
Madoka's Theme ~ In Blue まどかのテーマ ～in blue "Madoka no TE-MA ~ in blue" (MSC: Sagisu Shirou 鷺巣詩郎 ARG: Sagisu Shirou 鷺巣詩郎) 1:16
Heavy and severe (MSC: Sagisu Shirou 鷺巣詩郎 ARG: Sagisu Shirou 鷺巣詩郎) 2:00
Eye Catch! (MSC: Sagisu Shirou 鷺巣詩郎 ARG: Sagisu Shirou 鷺巣詩郎) 0:06
Look back my darling ふり向いてマイ・ダーリン "Furimuite MAI DAARIN" (SONG: Fujishiro Minako 藤代美奈子 LYC: Sawachi Takashi 澤地隆 MSC: Sagisu Shirou 鷺巣詩郎 ARG: Sagisu Shirou 鷺巣詩郎) [IS: Ep 24] 3:56
Again (SONG: Fujishiro Minako 藤代美奈子 LYC: Sawachi Takashi 澤地隆 MSC: Sagisu Shirou 鷺巣詩郎 ARG: Sagisu Shirou 鷺巣詩郎) 3:51
A boy meets a girl (MSC: Sagisu Shirou 鷺巣詩郎 ARG: Sagisu Shirou 鷺巣詩郎) 4:03
Breaking Heart ブレイキングハート "BUREIKINGU HAATO" (SONG: Tsubokura Yuiko 坪倉唯子 LYC: Show MSC: Sagisu Shirou 鷺巣詩郎 ARG: Sagisu Shirou 鷺巣詩郎 ) [IS: Ep 13] 4:02
You and Island cafe 君とIsland cafe "Kimi to Island cafe" (MSC: Sagisu Shirou 鷺巣詩郎 ARG: Sagisu Shirou 鷺巣詩郎) 3:15
THE DRAMATIC SQUARE (MSC: Sagisu Shirou 鷺巣詩郎 ARG: Sagisu Shirou 鷺巣詩郎) 2:25
BACK TO THE RED STRAW HAT TIME (MSC: Sagisu Shirou 鷺巣詩郎 ARG: Sagisu Shirou 鷺巣詩郎) 3:27
Sad Heart is Burning 悲しいハートは燃えている "kanashii HAATO wa moete-iru" (SONG: Wada Kanako 和田加奈子 LYC: Matsumoto Kazuki 松本一起 MSC: Inoue Daisuke 井上大輔 ARG: Shinkawa Hiroshi 新川博) [ED2] 4:04

(Bonus Karaoke Tracks – CD Re-released on ?? 1999 Futureland TYCY-5428 Total Time = ??)
Orange Mystery (Karaoke Version) オレンジ・ミステリー(カラオケ) "ORENJI MISUTERII" (SONG: Nagashima Hideyuki 長島秀幸 LYC: Urino Masao 売野雅勇 MSC: Nobody ARG: Sagisu Shirou 鷺巣詩郎) [OP2] 3:??
Like a salvia flower (Karaoke Version) サルビアの花のように(カラオケ) "SARUBIA no hana no you ni" (SONG: Wada Kanako 和田加奈子 LYC: Yukawa Reiko 湯川 れい子 MSC: Oda Yuuichirou 小田裕一郎 ARG: Irie Jun 入江純) [IS: Ep 22] 3:??

Sound Color 3

Serial No – LD32-5067

Dance In The Memories ダンス・イン・ザ・メモリーズ (SONG: Nakahara Meiko 中原めいこ LYC: Nakahara Meiko 中原めいこ MSC: Nakahara Meiko 中原めいこ ARG: Nishihira Akira 西平彰) [ED3] 4:09
Rememiniscence... of you in the red straw hat 追憶…赤い麦わら帽子の君へ "Tsuisou... akai mugiwara boushi no kimi e" (MSC: Sagisu Shirou 鷺巣詩郎 ARG: Sagisu Shirou 鷺巣詩郎) 3:11
After Heartbreak (MSC: Sagisu Shirou 鷺巣詩郎 ARG: Sagisu Shirou 鷺巣詩郎) 1:52
Fly me to the ski (MSC: Sagisu Shirou 鷺巣詩郎 ARG: Sagisu Shirou 鷺巣詩郎) 2:00
Under the tree of memories 想い出の樹の下で "Omoide no ki no shita de" (MSC: Sagisu Shirou 鷺巣詩郎 ARG: Sagisu Shirou 鷺巣詩郎) 3:10
Night and Day (SONG: BLUEW LYC: Katayama Keishi 片山圭司 MSC: Katayama Keishi 片山圭司 ARG: BLUEW) [IS: Ep 46] 4:25
ORANGE VICE (MSC: Sagisu Shirou 鷺巣詩郎 ARG: Sagisu Shirou 鷺巣詩郎) 2:23
I would want to be a night ranger ナイトレンジャーになりきりたい "NAITO RENJA- ni narikiritai" (MSC: Sagisu Shirou 鷺巣詩郎 ARG: Sagisu Shirou 鷺巣詩郎) 1:45
Madoka's Theme ~ in Lovers Room まどかのテーマ ～in Lovers Room "Madoka no TE-MA ~ in Lovers Room" (MSC: Sagisu Shirou 鷺巣詩郎 ARG: Sagisu Shirou 鷺巣詩郎) 2:26
Romantic with you 君とRomantic "Kimi to Romantic" (MSC: Sagisu Shirou 鷺巣詩郎 ARG: Sagisu Shirou 鷺巣詩郎) 2:16
My Little girl (MSC: Sagisu Shirou 鷺巣詩郎 ARG: Sagisu Shirou 鷺巣詩郎) 1:50
Next to come (3rd. season) (MSC: Sagisu Shirou 鷺巣詩郎 ARG: Sagisu Shirou 鷺巣詩郎) 0:30
Actress In The Mirror 鏡の中のアクトレス "kagami no naka no AKUTORESU" (SONG: Nakahara Meiko 中原めいこ LYC: Nakahara Meiko 中原めいこ MSC: Nakahara Meiko 中原めいこ ARG: Nishihira Akira 西平彰) [OP3] 3:31
Love is in your eyes 愛は瞳の中に "Ai wa hitomi no naka ni" (MSC: Sagisu Shirou 鷺巣詩郎 ARG: Sagisu Shirou 鷺巣詩郎) 4:14
Tell me that you love me (MSC: Nobody ARG: Sagisu Shirou 鷺巣詩郎) 2:18
One more yesterday もうひとつのイエスタデイ "Mou hitotsu no IESUTADEI" (SONG: Wada Kanako 和田加奈子 LYC: Tetsu MSC: Nagashima Hideyuki 長島秀幸 ARG: Sagisu Shirou 鷺巣詩郎) [IS] 4:35
See you tomorrow! また明日！ "Mata ashita!" (MSC: Sagisu Shirou 鷺巣詩郎 ARG: Sagisu Shirou 鷺巣詩郎) 1:38

(Bonus Karaoke Tracks – CD Re-released on 1999 Futureland TYCY-5429 Total Time = )
One more yesterday (Karaoke Version) もうひとつのイエスタデイ(カラオケ) "Mou hitotsu no IESUTADEI" (SONG: Nagashima Hideyuki 長島秀幸 LYC: Tetsu MSC: Nagashima Hideyuki 長島秀幸 ARG: Sagisu Shirou 鷺巣詩郎) [IS] 4:
Dance In The Memories (Karaoke Version) ダンス・イン・ザ・メモリーズ(カラオケ) (SONG: Nakahara Meiko 中原めいこ LYC: Nakahara Meiko 中原めいこ MSC: Nakahara Meiko 中原めいこ ARG: Nishihira Akira 西平彰) [ED3] 4:

Kimagure Orange Road CD Collection - Special BGM Shuu Tsuki

Just Plucking Off Love “mogitate no koi” (Kawauchi Rie)  [OP] 3:20
Scorching Paradise “shakunetsu paradise” 1:22
Seaside Dream “Seaside yochi Dream” 2:55
Summertime Triangle 2:52
Kimagure Angel “Kimagure tenshi” (Kawauchi Rie)  4:21
de Maimu que 2:21
Beating Summertime Graffiti “tokimeki natsu-iro graffiti” (Kawauchi Rie) 1:44
Jealous Beat “beat de shitto” 4:14
Island of Forbidden Love “kinjirareta koi no shima” 3:10
Love Chase at the Beach “nagisa no Love Chase” 4:36
'Heart' o Nice Catch (kawauchi rie) 3:23
Waku Waku Island 2:30
Telepathy Scramble 1:20
Marine Paradise 1:21
Escape 1:46
ABCB 2:21
Don't Make Me Get Lost, Madonna “mayowasenaide Madonna” 1:14
Secret Command “himitsu shirei” 1:16
My Darling Love “itoshi no My Love” 1:18
Carrying Summer Memories... “natsu no omoi o nosete...” 1:11

Kimagure Orange Station

 is a compilation album released for the anime television series Kimagure Orange Road. The album was produced by Futureland and released in Japan on 6 April 1988. The release was made to sound like a radio station recording, with the four main characters from the series acting as DJs.

Composer: Nobody
Arrangement: Shirō Sagisu
Lyrics: Masao Urino (売野雅勇)
Vocals: Hideyuki Nagashima (長島秀幸)
Second opening theme, 3:51

Composer: Daisuke Inoue (井上大輔)
Arrangement: Hiroshi Shinkawa (新川博)
Lyrics: Kazuki Matsumoto (松本一起)
Vocals: Kanako Wada (和田加奈子)
Second ending theme,  4:04

Composer: Shirō Sagisu
Arrangement: Shirō Sagisu
Lyrics: Takashi Sawachi (澤地隆)
Vocals: Minako Fujishiro (藤代美奈子)
Insert song, episode 24, 3:56

Composer: Shirō Sagisu
Arrangement: Shirō Sagisu
Lyrics: Show
Vocals: Yuiko Tsubokura (坪倉唯子)
Insert song, episode 13, 4:02

Composer: Meiko Nakahara (中原めいこ)
Arrangement: Akira Nishihira (西平彰)
Lyrics: Meiko Nakahara
Vocals: Meiko Nakahara
Third opening theme, 3:31

Composer: Tsunehiro Izumi (和泉常寛)
Arrangement: Hiroshi Shinkawa (新川博)
Lyrics: Masao Urino
Vocals: Masanori Ikeda (池田政典)
Insert song, episode 11, 4:14

Composer: Meiko Nakahara
Arrangement: Akira Nishihira
Lyrics: Meiko Nakahara
Vocals: Maiko Nakahara
Third ending theme, 4:09

Composer: Tsukasa
Arrangement: Shirō Sagisu
Lyrics: Reiko Yukawa (湯川 れい子)
Vocals: Kanako Wada
First ending theme, 4:30

Composer: Yūichirō Oda (小田裕一郎)
Arrangement: Jun Irie (入江純)
Lyrics: Reiko Yukawa
Vocals: Kanako Wada
Insert song, episode 22, 3:58
Night of Summer Side
Composer: Nobody
Arrangement: Hiroshi Shinkawa
Lyrics: Masao Urino
Vocals: Masanori Ikeda (池田政典)
First opening theme, 4:06

The album was rereleased in 1999 by Futureland (TYCY-5069) with two additional bonus karaoke tracks.
A Sad Heart Is Burning
Actress In The Mirror

Sources:

Kimagure Orange Road – Singing Heart

Serial No – LD32-5061

Summer Mirage 夏のミラージュ "natsu no MIRA-JU" (SONG: Wada Kanako 和田加奈子 LYC: Yukawa Reiko 湯川 れい子 MSC: Tsukasa ARG: Sagisu Shirou 鷺巣詩郎) [ED1] 4:30
Orange Mystery オレンジ・ミステリー "ORENJI MISUTERII" (SONG: Nagashima Hideyuki 長島秀幸 LYC: Masao Urino 売野雅勇 MSC: Nobody ARG: Sagisu Shirou 鷺巣詩郎) [OP2] 3:51
Look back my darling ふり向いてマイ・ダーリン "Furimuite MAI DAARIN" (SONG: Fujishiro Minako 藤代美奈子 LYC: Sawachi Takashi 澤地隆 MSC: Sagisu Shirou 鷺巣詩郎 ARG: Sagisu Shirou 鷺巣詩郎) [IS: Ep 24] 3:56
Janina ジェニーナ "JENI-NA" (SONG: Wada Kanako 和田加奈子 LYC: Yukawa Reiko 湯川 れい子 MSC: Sagisu Shirou 鷺巣詩郎 ARG: Sagisu Shirou 鷺巣詩郎) [IS: Ep 12] 4:38
Night Of Summer Side (SONG: Ikeda Masanori 池田政典 LYC: Urino Masao 売野雅勇 MSC: Nobody ARG: Shinkawa Hiroshi 新川博) [OP1] 4:06
One more yesterday もうひとつのイエスタデイ "Mou hitotsu no IESUTADEI" (SONG: Wada Kanako 和田加奈子 LYC: Yukawa Reiko 湯川 れい子 MSC: Oda Yuuichirou 小田裕一郎 ARG: Irie Jun 入江純) [IS] 4:35
Again (SONG: Fujishiro Minako 藤代美奈子 LYC: Sawachi Takashi 澤地隆 MSC: Sagisu Shirou 鷺巣詩郎 ARG: Sagisu Shirou 鷺巣詩郎) 3:51
Breaking Heart ブレイキングハート "BUREIKINGU HAATO" (SONG: Tsubokura Yuiko 坪倉唯子 LYC: Show MSC: Sagisu Shirou 鷺巣詩郎 ARG: Sagisu Shirou 鷺巣詩郎) [IS: Ep 13] 4:02
Like a salvia flower サルビアの花のように "SARUBIA no hana no you ni" (SONG: Wada Kanako 和田加奈子 LYC: Yukawa Reiko 湯川 れい子 MSC: Oda Yuuichirou 小田裕一郎 ARG: Irie Jun 入江純) [IS: Ep 22] 3:58
Dangerous Triangle 危険なトライアングル "Kiken-na TORAIANGURU" (SONG: Ikeda Masanori 池田政典 LYC: Urino Masao 売野雅勇 MSC: Izumi Tsunehiro 和泉常寛 ARG: Shinkawa Hiroshi 新川博) [IS: Ep 11] 4:14
Sad Heart is Burning 悲しいハートは燃えている "kanashii HAATO wa moete-iru" (SONG: Wada Kanako 和田加奈子 LYC: Matsumoto Kazuki 松本一起 MSC: Inoue Daisuke 井上大輔 ARG: Shinkawa Hiroshi 新川博) [ED2] 4:04
One more time in my heart この胸にONE MORE TIME "Kono mune ni ONE MORE TIME" (SONG: Nagashima Hideyuki 長島秀幸 LYC: Tetsu MSC: Nagashima Hideyuki 長島秀幸 ARG: Sagisu Shirou 鷺巣詩郎) 4:40
(Bonus Karaoke Tracks – CD Re-released on ?? 1999 Futureland TYCY-5061 Total Time = ??)
Look back my darling (Karaoke Version) ふり向いてマイ・ダーリン(カラオケ) "Furimuite MAI DAARIN" (SONG: Fujishiro Minako 藤代美奈子 LYC: Sawachi Takashi 澤地隆 MSC: Sagisu Shirou 鷺巣詩郎 ARG: Sagisu Shirou 鷺巣詩郎) [IS: Ep 24] 3:??
Again (Karaoke Version) (SONG: Fujishiro Minako 藤代美奈子 LYC: Sawachi Takashi 澤地隆 MSC: Sagisu Shirou 鷺巣詩郎 ARG: Sagisu Shirou 鷺巣詩郎) 3:??

Kimagure Orange Road – Loving Heart

Track listing
Serial No - LD32-5099

Actress In The Mirror 鏡の中のアクトレス "kagami no naka no AKUTORESU" (SONG: Nakahara Meiko 中原めいこ LYC: Nakahara Meiko 中原めいこ MSC: Nakahara Meiko 中原めいこ ARG: Nishihira Akira 西平彰) [OP3] 3:31
Summer Mirage 夏のミラージュ "natsu no MIRA-JU" (SONG: Wada Kanako 和田加奈子 LYC: Yukawa Reiko 湯川 れい子 MSC: Tsukasa ARG: Sagisu Shirou 鷺巣詩郎) [ED1] 4:30
Tender Jealousy 優しいジェラシー "yasashii JERASHII" (SONG: Tomizawa Michie 富沢美智恵・Honda Chieko 本多知恵子 LYC: Sawachi Ryu 澤地隆 MSC: Sagisu Shirou 鷺巣詩郎 ARG: Sagisu Shirou 鷺巣詩郎) 4:45
Sad Heart is Burning 悲しいハートは燃えている "kanashii HAATO wa moete-iru" (SONG: Wada Kanako 和田加奈子 LYC: Matsumoto Kazuki 松本一起 MSC: Inoue Daisuke 井上大輔 ARG: Shinkawa Hiroshi 新川博) [ED2] 4:04
Bayside Dancer (SONG: Furuya Touru 古谷 徹 LYC: Sawachi Ryu 澤地隆 MSC: Sagisu Shirou 鷺巣詩郎 ARG: Sagisu Shirou 鷺巣詩郎) 5:32
Uncertain I Love You 不確かな I LOVE YOU "futashikana I Love You" (SONG: Wada Kanako 和田加奈子 LYC: Miura Noriko 三浦德子 MSC: Mizushima Yasuhiro 水島康宏 ARG: Hiraiwa Yoshinobu 平岩嘉信) 3:55
Night Of Summer Side (SONG: Ikeda Masanori 池田政典 LYC: Urino Masao 売野雅勇 MSC: Nobody ARG: Shinkawa Hiroshi 新川博) [OP1] 4:06
Golden Hill Road こがね色の坂道 "kogane-iro no sakamichi" (SONG: Hara Eriko 原えりこ LYC: Sawachi Ryu 澤地隆 MSC: Sagisu Shirou 鷺巣詩郎 ARG: Sagisu Shirou 鷺巣詩郎) 5:23
Dance In The Memories ダンス・イン・ザ・メモリーズ (SONG: Nakahara Meiko 中原めいこ LYC: Nakahara Meiko 中原めいこ MSC: Nakahara Meiko 中原めいこ ARG: Nishihira Akira 西平彰) [ED3] 4:09
Night and Day (SONG: BLUEW LYC: Katayama Keishi 片山圭司 MSC: Katayama Keishi 片山圭司 ARG: BLUEW) [IS: Ep 46] 4:25
Like a bird 鳥のように "tori no yoo ni" (SONG: Wada Kanako 和田加奈子 LYC: Wada Kanako 和田加奈子 MSC: Hisaishi Jou 久石讓 ARG: Hisaishi Jou 久石讓) 4:16
Dangerous Triangle 危険なトライアングル "Kiken-na TORAIANGURU" (SONG: Ikeda Masanori 池田政典 LYC: Masao Urino 売野雅勇 MSC: Izumi Tsunehiro 和泉常寛 ARG: Shinkawa Hiroshi 新川博) [IS: Ep 11] 4:14
Whispering Misty Night (SONG: Tsuru Hiromi 鶴ひろみ LYC: Sawachi Ryu 澤地隆 MSC: Sagisu Shirou 鷺巣詩郎 ARG: Sagisu Shirou 鷺巣詩郎) 5:17
Orange Mystery オレンジ・ミステリー "ORENJI MISUTERII" (SONG: Nagashima Hideyuki 長島秀幸 LYC: Urino Masao 売野雅勇 MSC: Nobody ARG: Sagisu Shirou 鷺巣詩郎) [OP2] 3:51
Embrace The Sky あの空を抱きしめて "ano sora wo dakishimete" (SONG: Wada Kanako 和田加奈子 LYC: Wada Kanako 和田加奈子 MSC: Izuta Hiroyuki 伊豆田洋之 ARG: Shirai Yoshiaki 白井良明) 4:19
(Bonus Karaoke Tracks - CD Re-released on March 15, 1995 Futureland TYCY-5435 Total Time = 76:43)
Tender Jealousy (Karaoke version) 優しいジェラシー(カラオケ) "yasashii JERASHII" (SONG: Tomizawa Michie 富沢美智恵・Honda Chieko 本多知恵子 LYC: Sawachi Ryu 澤地隆 MSC: Sagisu Shirou 鷺巣詩郎 ARG: Sagisu Shirou 鷺巣詩郎) 4:??
Whispering Misty Night (Karaoke version) (SONG: Tsuru Hiromi 鶴ひろみ LYC: Sawachi Ryu 澤地隆 MSC: Sagisu Shirou 鷺巣詩郎 ARG: Sagisu Shirou 鷺巣詩郎) 5:??

Kimagure Orange Road: I Want to Return to That Day

 is a soundtrack album released for the anime film by the same title. The album was produced by Futureland and released in Japan on 5 October 1988.

Track listing
Serial No - LD32-5084

Composer: Hiroyuki Izuta (伊豆田洋之)
Arrangement: Yoshiaki Shirai (白井良明)
Lyrics: Kanako Wada (和田加奈子)
Vocals: Kanako Wada
4:19

Composer: Shirō Sagisu
Arrangement: Shirō Sagisu
2:20
Say Good-bye
Composer: Shirō Sagisu
Arrangement: Shirō Sagisu
1:22
Return to Three
Composer: Shirō Sagisu
Arrangement: Shirō Sagisu
2:06
I Don't Know Why, Why You Don't!?
Composer: Shirō Sagisu
Arrangement: Shirō Sagisu
1:53

Composer: Shirō Sagisu
Arrangement: Shirō Sagisu
2:12

Composer: Shirō Sagisu
Arrangement: Shirō Sagisu
5:09

Composer: Shirō Sagisu
Arrangement: Shirō Sagisu
1:13

Composer: Yasuhiro Mizushima (水島康宏)
Arrangement: Yoshinobu Hiraiwa (平岩嘉信)
Lyrics: Noriko Miura (三浦德子)
Vocals: Kanako Wada
3:55
Shop of "Dry"
Composer: Shirō Sagisu
Arrangement: Shirō Sagisu
2:27
Beat Emotion
Composer: Shirō Sagisu
Arrangement: Shirō Sagisu
1:25
Teardrops
Composer: Shirō Sagisu
Arrangement: Shirō Sagisu
0:31
Call My Name
Composer: Shirō Sagisu
Arrangement: Shirō Sagisu
1:26
Be Your Only One
Composer: Shirō Sagisu
Arrangement: Shirō Sagisu
1:52

Composer: Joe Hisaishi
Arrangement: Joe Hisaishi
Lyrics: Kanako Wada
Vocals: Kanako Wada
4:16

The album was rereleased  in 1999 (TYCY-5084, Futureland) with the following two bonus karaoke tracks:
Embracing the Sky
An Uncertain "I Love You"

New Kimagure Orange Road Original Soundtrack

The  is the soundtrack album for the 1996 Shin Kimagure Orange Road: Summer's Beginning anime film. The soundtrack was released in Japan on 1 November 1996 by VAP. The title literally means "And so, the Beginning of That Summer".

Track listing
Opening Theme (KYOSUKE No.1) [OP] 3:45
Love I 3:51
Memory I 思い出I "Omoide I" 2:32
At a loss 途方に暮れて "Tohou ni kurete" 3:27
From a window 窓辺から (KYOSUKE No.1) "Madobe kara" 3:17
Where are you... 何処にいるの… "Doko ni iru-no..." 3:26
Love Is Power [IS] 5:06
Memory II 思い出II "Omoide II" 3:17
Lounge I ラウンジI 2:04
Lounge II ラウンジII 1:55
Intersecting Hearts 交錯する想い "Kousa-suru Omoi" 3:42
Theme of Kyousuke I 恭介のテーマI "Kyousuke no Theme I" 2:00
Meeting Again 再会 "Saikai" 1:45
Don't Be Afraid [IS] 4:07
Door to the other world 異世界の扉 "Isekai eno Tobira" 6:23
I want you to be here (KYOSUKE No.1) あなたにここにいて欲しい(KYOSUKE No.1) "Anata ni koko ni ite-hoshii" 3:48
Theme of Kyosuke II 恭介のテーマII "Kyosuke no Theme II" 1:41
Love II 4:42
Being close together 寄り添う2人(KYOSUKE No.1) "Yorisou Futari" 3:47
Now, and Future 今，そしてこれから "Ima, soshite Korekara" 3:41
Day Dream - I'm at your side DAY DREAM～そばにいるよ "DAY DREAM - Soba ni iruyo" [MT] 4:11

References

External links
 JVC Victor Japan Homepage
 Orange Road France
 Kimagure Orange Road Universe - I CD musicali
 Kimagure Orange Road Media Page

Anime soundtracks
Soundtracks
Lists of albums